Ploima is an order of rotifers, microscopic invertebrates found in marine and freshwater habitats.

Families
According to the World Register of Marine Species, Ploima includes the following fifteen families:
Asplanchnidae
Brachionidae
Dicranophoridae
Epiphanidae
Euchlanidae
Gastropodidae
Lecanidae
Lepadellidae
Lindiidae
Mytilinidae
Notommatidae
Proalidae
Synchaetidae
Trichocercidae
Trichotriidae

References

 
Protostome orders
Monogononta